L8 may refer to:
 HMS L8, a British submarine
 L-8, an L-class blimp of the US Navy that turned up without its crew over Daly City, California in 1942
 Lotta Schelin, a Swedish football player
 an internal designation for the Daimler CL.I German fighter aircraft
 ISO/IEC 8859-14 (Latin-8), an 8-bit character set

See also
 Late (disambiguation), an homophone
 L8R (disambiguation), an abbreviation
 8L (disambiguation)